The Beatles: The Collection was a vinyl boxed set of every Beatles album remastered at half speed from the original stereo master recordings, except for Magical Mystery Tour which was mastered from Capitol Records' submasters with the last three tracks in rechanneled stereo.

Release
Released with much anticipation in early October 1982, The Collection was lauded by critics and Beatles fans worldwide for the superb sound, and sold-out completely within the first year. Mobile Fidelity Sound Lab (MFSL) pressed a second run of the Beatles Boxed Set for a total production run of 25,000 over the next two years or until October 1985.

Each album was pressed on black vinyl by the Victor Company of Japan. The album covers were replaced with photographs of tape boxes and log sheet. The original album covers were included in a booklet which also featured a certificate of authenticity as this was a limited edition collection. Missing from this collection were all of the Beatles' singles, extended play and a few miscellaneous tracks that did not appear on their original UK albums.

Contents
 Please Please Me – MFSL1-101
 With the Beatles – MFSL1-102
 A Hard Day's Night – MFSL1-103
 Beatles for Sale – MFSL1-104
 Help! – MFSL1-105
 Rubber Soul – MFSL1-106
 Revolver – MFSL1-107
 Sgt. Pepper's Lonely Hearts Club Band – MFSL1-100
 Magical Mystery Tour – MFSL1-047
 The Beatles – MFSL2-072 (2 LPs)
 Yellow Submarine – MFSL1-108
 Abbey Road – MFSL1-023
 Let It Be – MFSL1-109

See also 
The Beatles Collection
The Beatles Box
The Beatles Mono Collection
The Beatles Boxed Set
The Beatles (The Original Studio Recordings)
The Beatles in Mono

References

External links
Detailed information about the MFSL releases.

The Beatles compilation albums
1982 compilation albums
Albums arranged by George Martin
Albums arranged by Paul McCartney
Albums conducted by George Martin
Albums conducted by Paul McCartney
Albums arranged by George Harrison
Albums conducted by George Harrison
Albums arranged by John Lennon
Albums conducted by John Lennon
Reissue albums